The term Italian music is ambiguous and may refer to several topics:

The music of Italy
The folk, popular, classical (especially opera) musics of Italy and the Italian peoples
The music of Italian people in the United States or other countries